Real Life Hits is an album by vibraphonist Gary Burton recorded in 1984 and released on the ECM label in 1985. Featuring Burton with pianist Makoto Ozone, bassist Steve Swallow and drummer Michael Hyman.

Reception 
The Allmusic review by Scott Yanow awarded the album 4 stars, stating, "The appealing group sound and the spontaneous yet tight ensembles and solos make this a worthwhile acquisition".

T rack listing 
 "Syndrome" (Carla Bley) - 6:19
 "The Beatles" (John Scofield) - 6:46
 "Fleurette Africaine" (Duke Ellington) - 7:04   
 "Ladies in Mercedes" (Steve Swallow) - 6:21
 "Real Life Hits" (Carla Bley) - 8:36
 "I Need You Here" (Makoto Ozone) - 8:46 
 "Ivanushka Durachok" (German Lukyanov) - 6:23

Personnel 
 Gary Burton — vibraphone
 Makoto Ozone — piano
 Steve Swallow — electric bass
 Mike Hyman — drums

References 

ECM Records albums
Gary Burton albums
Albums produced by Manfred Eicher
1985 albums